Gilbert Bigio is a retired Haitian businessman. He is the founder of GB Group and Haiti's only billionaire. He was sanctioned by the Government of Canada for his involvement in arms trafficking and human rights violations in Haiti. Bigio is also the de facto leader of Haiti's Jewish community and an honorary consul to Israel.

Bigio's name appeared in the 2021 Pandora Papers leak of secret offshore company documents by the ICIJ. In an accounting document from the estate of Jeffrey Epstein, Bigio was revealed as the buyer of Epstein's Mercedes Maybach at a price of $132,000. Other leaked documents showed Bigio moving wealth to Miami and Switzerland through offshore companies in different tax havens.

Early years
Bigio is from a Sephardic Jewish family from Aleppo, Syria, whose family emigrated to Haiti in 1896. The family has also been involved in other commercial activities all throughout the country. The Bigio family has remained in Haiti, prominent in business affairs for three generations.

Canadian Government Sanctions Against Bigio 
On December 2, 2022 the Government of Canada imposed sanctions against Bigio, along with two other Haitian businessmen; Reynold Deeb and Sherif Abdallah. The sanctions against Bigio was a response to his alleged participation in "gross and systematic human rights violations in Haiti and engaged in acts that threaten the peace, security, and stability of Haiti." The Canadian sanctions against Bigio were intended to stop the flow of illicit funds and weapons to armed criminal gangs in Haiti.

Specifically Bigio is accused of supporting "illegal activities of armed criminal gangs, including through money laundering and other acts of corruption" according to a statement from the Canadian Minister of Foreign Affairs.

References

Living people
Haitian billionaires
Haitian businesspeople
Haitian diplomats
Haitian Jews
Haitian people of Syrian-Jewish descent
Syrian billionaires
North American Sephardi Jews
Year of birth missing (living people)
Pandora Papers